Frank Pruitt Lockhart (April 8, 1881 – August 25, 1949) was an American diplomat who served for many years in China.

Early life
Lockhart was born April 8, 1881, in Pittsburg, Texas.

He attended Grayson College. Following graduation he first worked as a newspaper editor in Texas. After two years, he moved to Washington, D.C. where he worked as a private secretary to Morris Sheppard, then serving as a member of the United States Senate.

Diplomatic career

In 1914, Lockhart joined the United States Department of State as assistant chief of the Division of Far Eastern Affairs, eventually rising to chief of the division.  He was involved in the Washington Naval Conference on arms control. In 1925, he was appointed U.S. Consul-General in Hankou. and between 1931 and 1933, was U.S. Consul-General in Tianjin. In 1933, he was transferred to the U.S. Embassy in Peiping as Counsellor. Lockhart was appointed Consul-General in Shanghai, in 1939 serving until December 7, 1941 when the Consulate was occupied at the beginning of the Pacific War. He was interned until he was repatriated in mid-1942 on the MS Gripsholm.
 
In October 1942, he became chief of the Office of Philippine Affairs and promoted to the chief of the Division of Philippine Affairs in Jan 1944 until his retirement in 1946.  He subsequently joined the American Foreign Service Association, serving as a director and business manager of the Foreign Service Journal.

Family
Lockhart married Ruby Hess in 1904.  They had a son, Frank Pruitt Lochhart Jr. and a daughter, Maurine.

Death
Lockhart died on August 25, 1949 at the George Washington University Hospital in Washington, D.C.  He was interred in Rose Hill Cemetery in Pittsburg, Texas

References 

1881 births
1949 deaths
American diplomats
Consuls general of the United States in Shanghai
People from Pittsburg, Texas
Grayson College alumni